Team Canada represents Canada in women's international roller derby.  The current team was first formed to compete at the 2011 Roller Derby World Cup, and finished the tournament in second place to Team USA, losing the final 336 points to 33. Team Canada has finished in the top four at each Roller Derby World Cup thus far.

A previous Team Canada toured England and Scotland in June 2008. Skaters from the Calgary Roller Derby Association, Oil City Derby Girls, Saskatoon Roller Derby, Terminal City Roller Girls and Toronto Roller Derby played bouts against the Birmingham Blitz Dames, Glasgow Roller Girls and London Rollergirls.

2018 team
Tryouts for the team that would compete at the 2018 Roller Derby World Cup were held in October 2016 in Rockland, Ontario and Calgary. The resulting roster was then announced in November 2016, at the time referred to as the "2017 roster", as the third world cup was at the time expected to be held in late 2017. This initial training roster comprised 28 skaters, plus six additional "developmental" skaters, who would have the opportunity to train with the rest of the team, encouraging growth.

2018 team roster
(league affiliations as of the time of the announcement)

Notes

2018 coaching staff
The coaching staff for this edition was announced in July 2016.
 Head coach – Jessica "Bandit" Paternostro – Montreal Roller Derby
 Assistant coach – Bryan "Flyin' Bryan Killman" McWilliam – Toronto Roller Derby
 Strength and conditioning Coach - Ian "Johnny Qwadd" Verchere - Terminal City Rollergirls
 Team Manager - Fawn Hall - Mainland Misfits
 Business Manager - Alyssa "Georgia W. Tush" Kwasny – Montreal Roller Derby
 Chef de Mission - Germaine "P1" Koh - Terminal City Rollergirls

2018 Roller Derby World Cup
At the 2018 World Cup in Manchester, Team Canada claimed the bronze medal, with a 173-147 victory over Team England.

2014 team
A series of tryouts was announced for late 2013 to select the 2014 roster: 23 November in Saskatoon, Saskatchewan hosted by Saskatoon Roller Derby, 30 November in New Hamburg, Ontario hosted by Tri-City Roller Girls and 7 December in Chilliwack, British Columbia hosted by NWO Roller Girls. Over 150 skaters registered to tryout for Team Canada, with roughly half of them expected at the New Hamburg tryouts.

2014 team roster
The 2014 roster was released on 29 December 2013. (league affiliations as of the time of the announcement)

2014 coaching staff
In late 2013, the coaching staff for Team Canada at the 2014 Roller Derby World Cup was announced:
 Head coach – Ewan Wotarmy – Montreal Roller Derby
 Assistant coach – Mack the Mouth – Terminal City Rollergirls
 Manager – Flyin' Bryan Killman – Toronto Roller Derby

2014 Roller Derby World Cup
At the 2014 World Cup in Dallas, Team Canada finished in fourth place, losing the bronze medal match to Team Australia, 197-128.

2011 team

2011 team roster
There are over 100 roller derby leagues in Canada, and over 100 Canadian women tried out for the team in 2011. Tryouts were held first in Toronto, Ontario at Toronto Roller Derby, then in Calgary, Alberta hosted by the Calgary Roller Derby Association, and lastly in Vancouver, British Columbia hosted by Reign Valley Vixens Roller Derby. The skaters being considered were placed on a shortlist, and team management announced the following twenty skaters as the inaugural roster in August 2011 (skater's home league at time of rostering in parentheses):

2011 coaching staff
 Coach Pauly
 Furious P (Hammer City Roller Girls)
 Mack the Mouth (Terminal City Rollergirls)

2011 Roller Derby World Cup
Team Canada's first international action took place 1 December through 4 at the premiere Roller Derby World Cup, held in Toronto, Ontario, Canada. Team Canada, one of thirteen nations competing, began group play at the tournament in Group A, along with teams representing Brazil, Sweden and France. Team Canada won all three of its group bouts, defeating France 244 to 17, Sweden 196 to 26 and Brazil 408 to 7. As a result of the Group round play, Team Canada was seeded second overall for the remainder of the tournament (to Team USA) and received a bye past the first elimination round. In their first elimination bout, Canada defeated tenth-seeded Finland 499 to 31, at that time the highest point spread yet in the tournament. Team Canada next faced third-seeded Team England in the first semi-final of day 4, winning the bout 161 to 90, but losing skater Georgia W Tush to a broken collarbone in the process. This set up Team Canada to face Team USA in the final (after Team USA defeated fourth seed Team Australia) and Team USA won by a final score of 336 to 33. In taking the silver medal, Team Canada scored more points against number one seed Team USA than all other teams at the tournament combined. At the conclusion of the tournament, Iron Wench was voted the team's Most Valuable Player, and Smack Daddy was voted the MVP of the entire tournament.

Notes

References

Canada
Roller derby
Roller derby in Canada
2011 establishments in Canada
Sports clubs established in 2011